Abbasabad (also Romanized as ‘Abbāsābād; also known as ‘Abbāsābād-e Katūl) is a village in Estarabad Rural District, Kamalan District, Aliabad County, Golestan Province, Iran. At the 2006 census, its population was 703, in 171 families.

References 

Populated places in Aliabad County